Meseclazone (W-2395), also known as 2-methylseclazone, is a nonsteroidal anti-inflammatory drug (NSAID) developed in the 1970s. It functions as a prodrug to the 5-chloro derivative of salicyclic acid. It was never marketed on account of toxicity issues, namely pertaining to the liver.

See also 
 Salicyclic acid

References 

Analgesics
Nonsteroidal anti-inflammatory drugs